Robert Wear is an English former professional rugby league footballer who played for Cronulla in the New South Wales Rugby Football League (NSWRFL).

Playing career
Wear, an Englishman, played as a centre and winger during his career. He was in his late 20s by the time he debuted at Cronulla in 1970, having played in England for several seasons, which was mostly with Barrow but also included a stint at Warrington.

From 1970 to 1974, Wear played 103 first-grade games with Cronulla in the NSWRFL and scored a total of 29 tries, which included a hat-trick against Parramatta at Endeavour Field in 1973. He was on the wing for Cronulla in the club's 1973 grand final loss to Manly.

References

External links
Bob Wear at Rugby League project

Year of birth missing (living people)
Living people
Barrow Raiders players
Cronulla-Sutherland Sharks players
English rugby league players
Rugby league wingers
Rugby league centres
Warrington Wolves players